The Belli, also designated Beli or Belaiscos were an ancient pre-Roman Celtic  Celtiberian people who lived in the modern Spanish province of Zaragoza from the 3rd Century BC.

Origins 
Roman authors for unknown reasons wrote that the Belli were of mixed Illyrian and Celtic (Belgic) origin and probably related with the Bellovaci, who were said to have migrated to the Iberian Peninsula around the 4th Century BC and part of the Celtiberians. There is an overwhelming amount of evidence that the ancestors of the Celtiberian groups were installed in the Meseta area of the peninsula from at least 1000 BC and probably much earlier.

Location 

The Belli inhabited the middle Jiloca and Huerva river valleys in Zaragoza province with their territories stretching up to the Guadalope and upper Turia valleys, close to their neighbours and clients, the Titii.
Their early capital was Segeda (Poyo de Maya – Zaragoza; Celtiberian mint: Sekaiza), subsequently transferred to nearby Durón de Belmonte and later offset by Bilbilis (Valdeherrera, near Calatayud – Zaragoza; Celtiberian mint: Bilbiliz).  Other Belli urban centers included Nertobriga (La Almunia de Doña Godina – Zaragoza; Celtiberian mint: Nertobis), Contrebia Belaisca (Zaforas de Botorita – Zaragoza; Celtiberian mint: Contebacom Bel), Beligiom (Piquete de la Atalaya de Azuara – Zaragoza; Celtiberian mint: Belikiom), Lesera (El Forcal) and Belgeda (Belchite – Zaragoza).  It is plausible that by the 2nd Century BC they exerted some form of control over the strategic frontier towns of Belia (sited somewhere between the Huerva' and Aguas Vivas' rivers; Celtiberian mint: Belaiscom), Osicerda (El Palau de Alcañiz – Teruel; Iberian designation: Usercerte), Damania (Hinojosa de Jarque – Teruel; Celtiberian mint: Tamaniu) and Orosis (La Caridad de Caminreal – Teruel; Celtiberian mint: Orosiz), facing the Iberian Lobetani and Edetani peoples of the modern Valencia coastal region.

Culture 

The most culturally advanced of the peoples of southern Celtiberia, the Belli were the first Celtiberian tribe to adopt coinage in the aftermath of the 2nd Punic War and to post laws in written form on bronze tablets (Tabulae), using a modified Northeastern Iberian script (known as the Celtiberian script) for their own language. In this script and language they inscribed the characteristic Celtiberian 'hospitality tokens' which are small bronze objects, in two halves, each half being retained by people who stood in hospitality relationship to one another. These would act as a sort of identity card, and were probably used as safe-conducts or other warranties. The two halves have been found in places several hundreds of kilometres apart, which implies that the various Celtic groups maintained a system of communications throughout at least central Spain. 
The most complete Celtiberian text we have on the bronze 'hospitality tokens' that acted as a sort of identity card is from the Belli and reads lubos alisokum aualoske kontebias belaiskas meaning 'Lubos of the Aliso family, son of Aualos, from Contrebia Belaisca' showing the self-description of this man, by paternity, extended family and territory which is characteristically Celtic.

History 

During the 3rd-2nd centuries BC, the Belli joined the Celtiberian confederacy alongside the Arevaci, Lusones and Titii, with whom they developed close political and military ties – in 153 BC the Numantines even elected the Belli General Caros as leader of the Celtiberian coalition army that ambushed the Consul Quintus Fulvius Nobilior at the battle of Ribarroya, at the Baldano river valley in the beginning of the first Numantine War.  Prior to that, they had been forced in 181 BC to accept Roman suzerainty by Tiberius Sempronius Gracchus, but this did not prevent them from resisting further Roman encroachment of their lands as well as fighting off Turboletae raids and the Iberian Lobetani people.

Romanization 

Defeated in 143 BC by Proconsul Quintus Caecilius Metellus Macedonicus, and faced with the fall of Numantia in 133 BC and the subsequent collapse of the Celtiberian confederacy, the Belli territory was incorporated into Hispania Citerior province though little is known of their history afterwards.  The Belli appear to have remained independent until the Sertorian Wars of the early 1st Century BC, when they were gradually pushed back from the upper Jiloca by the Edetani who seized Beligiom, Belgeda, Damania and Orosis, therefore losing all the lands east of the Huerva River.  Around 72 BC they and their Titii allies merged with the pro-Roman Uraci, Cratistii and Olcades tribes to form the Late Celtiberian people (Latin: Celtiberi) of romanized southern Celtiberia.

See also
Belgae
Bellovaci
Celtiberian confederacy
Celtiberian script
Celtiberian Wars
Illyrians
Numantine War
Pre-Roman peoples of the Iberian Peninsula

Notes

Bibliography

 Ángel Montenegro et alii, Historia de España 2 - colonizaciones y formación de los pueblos prerromanos (1200-218 a.C), Editorial Gredos, Madrid (1989) 
 Alberto J. Lorrio, Los Celtíberos, Universidad Complutense de Madrid, Murcia (1997) 
 Francisco Burillo Mozota, Los Celtíberos, etnias y estados, Crítica, Barcelona (1998) 
 Rafael Trevino and Angus McBride, Rome's Enemies (4): Spanish Armies 218BC-19BC, Men-at-Arms series 180, Osprey Publishing Ltd, London (1986)

Further reading

Aedeen Cremin, The Celts in Europe, Sydney, Australia: Sydney Series in Celtic Studies 2, Centre for Celtic Studies, University of Sydney (1992) .
Dáithí Ó hÓgáin, The Celts: A History, The Collins Press, Cork (2002) 
Daniel Varga, The Roman Wars in Spain: The Military Confrontation with Guerrilla Warfare, Pen & Sword Military, Barnsley (2015) 
Ludwig Heinrich Dyck, The Roman Barbarian Wars: The Era of Roman Conquest, Author Solutions (2011) ISBNs 1426981821, 9781426981821

John T. Koch (ed.), Celtic Culture: A Historical Encyclopedia, ABC-CLIO Inc., Santa Barbara, California (2006) , 1-85109-445-8

External links
http://www.segeda.net
http://www.celtiberia.net

Celtic tribes of the Iberian Peninsula
Pre-Roman peoples of the Iberian Peninsula
Ancient peoples of Spain